Yusra Medical & Dental College (YM&DC) is a private medical college located in Islamabad. Cantonment General Hospital and Yusra General Hospital are attached to the college as a teaching hospital.

According to the World Directory of Medical Schools, the college is not currently operational and closed in 2018. It is not longer listed as an approved college of medicine by the Pakistani Medical Council.

Campus
The new College campus is still going through its final construction measures, which by the end will have an estimated cost of Rs. 375.00 million. The New Campus constitutes the following facilities.

Academic Block

Departments

Department of Medical Education (DME)
Basic Science Departments
Anatomy 
Physiology
Biochemistry
Pre-Clinical Departments
Pathology
Pharmacology
Community Medicine
Forensic Medicine
Behavioral Science
Clinical Departments
General medicine
General surgery
Ophthalmology
ENT
Anesthesiology
Pediatrics
Dermatology
Obstetrics and gynaecology
Radiotherapy
Urology
Neurosurgery
Orthopedics

See also
List of medical schools in Pakistan

References

External links

Medical colleges in Islamabad
Educational institutions established in 2010
Academic institutions in Pakistan
2010 establishments in Pakistan